is a passenger railway station  located in the city of Odawara, Kanagawa Prefecture, Japan, operated by the  East Japan Railway Company (JR East).

Lines
Kamonomiya Station is served by the Tōkaidō Main Line, and is located 80.8 kilometers from the line’s terminus at Tokyo Station. Some trains of the Shōnan-Shinjuku Line also stop at this station.

Station layout
Kamonomiya Station has a single island platform serving two tracks, with the station building is built on a cantilevered structure on top of the tracks and platform. The station is staffed.

Platforms

History
It was upgraded to a full station on June 1, 1923 as a station for both freight and passenger service. With the opening of the Tanna Tunnel, the Atami Line became the Tōkaidō Main Line from December 1, 1934. Regularly scheduled freight services were discontinued in 1970, and parcel services by 1972. The current station building was completed in 1976. With the completion of Quadruple tracks between Odawara and Ofuna, freight services were resumed as of March 31, 1987. With the dissolution and privatization of the JNR on April 1, 1987, the station came under the control of the East Japan Railway Company and the Japan Freight Railway Company. Automated turnstiles using the Suica IC Card system came into operation from November 18, 2001.

Passenger statistics
In fiscal 2019, the station was used by an average of 12,432 passengers daily.

The passenger figures (boarding passengers only) for previous years are as shown below.

Surrounding area
Kamonomiya is located east of central Odawara, and is home to several of Odawara's main shopping areas including Dynacity, Odawara City Mall and Robinsons. The area around Kamonomiya also contains a number of restaurants, bowling alleys, Karaoke bars, and Odawara's only movie theatres: Toho Cinema (near Robinsons) and Korona World.

The Korona World complex also contains an Onsen hot-spring bath.

References

 Yoshikawa, Fumio. Tokaido-sen 130-nen no ayumi. Grand-Prix Publishing (2002) .

External links

Official home page.
 Toho Cinema Odawara (Bilingual)
Kamonomiya Map 

Railway stations in Kanagawa Prefecture
Railway stations in Japan opened in 1923
Shōnan-Shinjuku Line
Railway stations in Odawara